Mudkhed was one of the 288 Vidhan Sabha (legislative assembly) constituencies of Maharashtra state, western India. This constituency was located in Nanded district. This constituency was abolished during  delimitation of the constituencies that happened in 2008.

Representatives
 1978: Chandrakant Govindrao Maski, Janata Party
 1980: Sahebrao Baradkar Deshmukh, Indian National Congress (Indira)
 1985: Sahebrao Baradkar Deshmukh, Indian National Congress
 1990: Sahebrao Baradkar Deshmukh, Indian National Congress
 1995: Sahebrao Baradkar Deshmukh, Indian National Congress
 1999: Ashok Chavan, Indian National Congress
 2004: Ashok Chavan, Indian National Congress

References

Politics of Nanded district
Former assembly constituencies of Maharashtra